Saltatricula is a genus of South American seed-eating birds in the tanager family Thraupidae.

Taxonomy and species list
The genus Saltatricula was introduced in 1861 by the German naturalist Hermann Burmeister with the many-colored Chaco finch as the type species. The name is a Latin diminutive of the genus Saltator that had been introduced by Louis Pierre Vieillot in 1816.

The black-throated saltator was formerly included in the genus Saltator. It was moved Saltatricula based on the results of a molecular phylogenetic study published in 2014 that found that the black-throated saltator was genetically distinct from the other members of the genus Saltator but was instead closely related to the many-colored Chaco finch.

The genus contains two species.

References

 
Bird genera